Allan Merrick Jeffers (1875–1926) was an American architect who practiced largely in Alberta, Canada.

Biography 
Allan Merrick Jeffers was born in Pawtucket, Rhode Island on February 8, 1875. Jeffers trained at the firm of architect George W. Cady in Providence and studied at the Rhode Island School of Design.

In April 1907, Jeffers moved to Edmonton, where he was hired as the Chief Architectural  Draftsman for the Alberta Department of Public Works. The same year, he was given responsibility for designing the province's new legislative building. Jeffers' subsequent design for the Alberta Legislature Building is the architect's best known work.

In 1923, Jeffers returned to the States, moving to California. He died on October 27, 1926, in Los Angeles, California.

Work 

 Calgary Normal School, Calgary (1906)
 Wetaskiwin Court House, Wetaskiwin (1907)
 Alberta Legislature Building (1907)
 Lands & Titles Building, Edmonton (1907)
 Athabasca Hall, University of Alberta (1911)
 Law Courts, Edmonton (1912) – demolished 1972
 North Edmonton Telephone Exchange, Edmonton (1912)
 Civic Block, Edmonton (1912)
 Assiniboia Hall, University of Alberta (1913)
 Fort Saskatchewan Court House, Fort Saskatchewan (1909)

References 

1875 births
1926 deaths
Architects from Pawtucket, Rhode Island
Rhode Island School of Design alumni
American emigrants to Canada